Ivica Jaraković (born 11 June 1978 in Užice) is a retired Serbian-Belgian professional footballer, who was last on the books of Woluwe-Zaventem.

Although originating from Serbia, Jaraković spent almost his entire career in Belgium, with only a one-year passage with 1. FC Magdeburg in Germany. He is currently living in Serbia but also owns a home in Belgium where he returns often, as since 2010 he is working for Kortrijk as a scout, looking for players in the Balkan region.

References

1978 births
Living people
Serbian footballers
Serbian expatriate footballers
Belgian Pro League players
Challenger Pro League players
FK Sloboda Užice players
R.S.C. Anderlecht players
R.W.D. Molenbeek players
K.V. Kortrijk players
K.A.A. Gent players
S.V. Zulte Waregem players
1. FC Magdeburg players
Oud-Heverlee Leuven players
K.V. Woluwe-Zaventem players
Expatriate footballers in Belgium
Expatriate footballers in Germany
Association football midfielders